The Copyright law of Nepal governs copyright, the right to control the use and distribution of artistic and creative works in Nepal and also encourages the creation of art and culture by rewarding authors and artists with a set of exclusive rights.
It is embodied in the Copyright Act, 2059 (2002), the Copyright Rule, 2061 (2004) and their amendments. Nepal Copyright Registrar's Office handles copyright registration, recording of copyright transfers and other administrative aspects of copyright law.

The Copyright Act, 2002 was enacted by Parliament of Nepal and came into force on 15 August 2002. It repealed the previous Copyright Act, 2022 (1965).

Economic rights
According to the law, the owner of copyright shall have the exclusive right to reproduce, translate, revise or amend,  sell, distribute or rent, broadcast or communicate the work to the general public. These rights are given for one time, it cannot be reissued once the duration is over.

Moral rights
The author is entitled for his lifetime, irrespective of the validity of the copyright, to get his/her name mentioned in copies of the work or in his/her work where it is used publicly and to make necessary amendment or revision in the work.

Duration of copyright
 Sound recording, broadcasting and performance - 50 years
 Art and photographs- 25 years
 Books - 50 years

Reproduction
 Reproduction is allowed freely for educational purposes with citation to the source.

References

External links 
 Official website of Nepal Copyright Registrar's Office
 Copyright Act, 2059 (2002): PDF
 Copyright Rule, 2061 (2004): PDF

Law of Nepal
Nepal
Intellectual property law in Asia
2002 establishments in Nepal